Christión was an American male R&B and record production duo from San Francisco Bay Area composed of brothers Kenni Ski and Allen Anthony. Briefly signed with Infrared Music Group, they contributed for Mr. Mike, 3X Krazy and Luniz before they released their debut single "Full of Smoke" in late 1996 for Roc-A-Fella Records, which peaked at No. 53 on the Billboard Hot 100 and No. 15 on the R&B Songs chart.

The single's success got the group a deal with Def Jam Recordings, who released their debut studio album Ghetto Cyrano in late 1997. The album peaked at No. 146 on the Billboard 200, No. 23 on the Top R&B/Hip-Hop Albums and No. 4 on the Heatseekers Albums, and scored two more moderate hits on the charts with "Bring Back Your Love" reaching No. 111 on the Billboard Hot 100 and No. 67 on the R&B chart and "I Wanna Get Next to You" reaching No. 86 on the Billboard Hot 100 and No. 32 on the R&B chart. The duo featured on Roc-A-Fella compilations Streets Is Watching Soundtrack and DJ Clue? Presents: Backstage Mixtape (Music Inspired by the Film).

The group rarely contributed to other artists' projects, being featured on The Jacka's and Lil' Al's solo debuts. In 2003, Anthony went solo, maintaining his Roc-A-Fella ties, and appeared on Freeway's single "Alright".

In 2005, Kenni Ski and T. Ross released the second Christión album Project Plato via The Mint Records. The sophomore project features the works of Bikram Singh, Ezra, Robbie Gennet and Trae James.

Discography

Studio albums

Singles
as lead artist

as featured artist

Guest appearances

References

External links

Living people
Sibling musical duos
Roc-A-Fella Records artists
American soul musical groups
Musical groups from San Francisco
Musical groups established in 1996
Musical groups disestablished in 2005
Year of birth missing (living people)